Terry is an unincorporated community in Lawrence County, South Dakota, United States.

History
A post office called Terry was established in 1892, and remained in operation until it was discontinued in 1929. The community took its name from nearby Terry Peak. Martha Jane Cannary, the frontierswoman better known as Calamity Jane, died in Terry on Saturday, August 1, 1903, from inflammation of the bowels and pneumonia, at the age of 51.

References

External links

Unincorporated communities in Lawrence County, South Dakota
1892 establishments in South Dakota
Populated places established in 1892
Unincorporated communities in South Dakota